Helmut Opschruf (21 June 1909 – 30 March 1992) was a German weightlifter. He competed in the men's light heavyweight event at the 1936 Summer Olympics.

References

External links
 

1909 births
1992 deaths
German male weightlifters
Olympic weightlifters of Germany
Weightlifters at the 1936 Summer Olympics
Sportspeople from Trier
20th-century German people